McEwensville is a borough in Northumberland County, Pennsylvania, United States. The population was 314 at the 2000 census.

Geography
McEwensville is located at  (41.072139, -76.818719).

Demographics

As of the census of 2000, there were 314 people, 116 households, and 83 families residing in the borough. The population density was 3,272.9 people per square mile (1,212.4/km2). There were 123 housing units at an average density of 1,282.1 per square mile (474.9/km2). The racial makeup of the borough was 98.41% White and 1.59% African American. Hispanic or Latino of any race were 0.32% of the population.

There were 116 households, out of which 38.8% had children under the age of 18 living with them, 62.1% were married couples living together, 6.9% had a female householder with no husband present, and 28.4% were non-families. 21.6% of all households were made up of individuals, and 7.8% had someone living alone who was 65 years of age or older. The average household size was 2.71 and the average family size was 3.07.

In the borough the population was spread out, with 32.8% under the age of 18, 6.4% from 18 to 24, 29.9% from 25 to 44, 16.6% from 45 to 64, and 14.3% who were 65 years of age or older. The median age was 31 years. For every 100 females there were 92.6 males. For every 100 females age 18 and over, there were 95.4 males.

The median income for a household in the borough was $35,500, and the median income for a family was $39,250. Males had a median income of $28,125 versus $21,250 for females. The per capita income for the borough was $15,309. About 4.8% of families and 6.9% of the population were below the poverty line, including 3.2% of those under age 18 and 8.0% of those age 65 or over.

Education
McEwensville is served by the Warrior Run School District.

Government
The mayor of McEwensville is Stacy Packer. McEwensville has a five-member borough council that meets the first Wednesday of each month at 5:30 PM unless otherwise noted. Council members are:

{|class="wikitable"
|-
|Mayor || Stacy Packer
|-
|President || Clyde Smith
|-
|Vice Pres. || Jason Buck
|-
|Secy/Treas || Brendi Brooke
|-
|Council Person || John Ficks
|-
|Council Person || Tina Clemens
|-
|Council Person || Gary Bennett
|-
|Solicitor || Robert Benion
|-
|Tax Collector || Jean Kline Smith
|-
|Caretaker || 
|-
|Code Officer || Light-Heigel, Assoc.
|-
|Permit Official || Light-Heigel, Assoc.
|-
|}

References

External links

 https://web.archive.org/web/20070928151321/http://www.seda-cog.org/nor-mcewensville/

Populated places established in 1825
Boroughs in Northumberland County, Pennsylvania
1857 establishments in Pennsylvania